Parabacteroides johnsonii  is a Gram-negative, obligately anaerobic, non-spore-forming, rod-shaped and non-motile bacterium from the genus of Parabacteroides which has been isolated from human faeces in Japan.

References 

Bacteroidia
Bacteria described in 2007